Switzerland has sent athletes to compete in every Games since it first participated at the Olympic Games at the inaugural 1896 Games.  Switzerland boycotted the 1956 Summer Olympics in Melbourne, but the equestrian events for those Games were held in Stockholm, Sweden earlier that year, where the Swiss dressage team won a bronze medal.

The National Olympic Committee for Switzerland was created and recognized in 1912.

Hosted Games 
Switzerland has hosted the Games on two occasions, both in St. Moritz. The nation has never hosted the Summer Olympics.

Medal tables 

*Red border colour indicates hosted tournaments.

Medals by Summer Games

Medals by Winter Games

Medals by summer sport

Medals by winter sport

List of medalists

Summer Olympics

Winter Olympics

Summary by sport

Gymnastics

Switzerland sent one gymnast to the first Games in 1896; Louis Zutter won the pommel horse and finished second in the vault and parallel bars.

Fencing

Switzerland first competed in fencing at the 1900 Games, with 3 fencers (two men's foilists, one of whom also competed in the épée, and a men's sabreur); none advanced past the quarterfinals.

Sailing

Switzerland was one of the nations competing in the first Olympic sailing competitions in 1900. The Swiss team included the first female Olympian, who was also the first female Olympic medalist and first female Olympic champion; Hélène de Pourtalès won a gold medal and a silver medal as a member of the crew of the Lérina.

Shooting

Switzerland had one shooter in one event at the inaugural 1896 Games, placing eighth. In 1900, the Swiss dominated the shooting competitions and took 5 out of the 9 gold medals including both of the team championships.

See also
 List of flag bearers for Switzerland at the Olympics
 :Category:Olympic competitors for Switzerland
 Switzerland at the Paralympics

External links